Charles Ornstein is an American journalist. He is currently a senior editor for ProPublica specializing in health care issues, including medical quality, the United States Department of Veterans Affairs and Big Pharma. He is also an adjunct associate professor of journalism at Columbia University.

Born in Detroit, Michigan, Ornstein attended Hillel Day School. He is a graduate of the University of Pennsylvania, where he majored in history and psychology and was editor of the college newspaper, the Daily Pennsylvanian. In 1999-2000, he was a Media Fellow with the Henry J. Kaiser Family Foundation. He is a past president and vice president of the Association of Health Care Journalists. He was a reporter for The Dallas Morning News (where he covered health care on the business desk and worked in the Washington bureau) before joining the metro investigative projects team at the Los Angeles Times.

In 2004, Ornstein and Tracy Weber reported "The Trouble at King/Drew Hospital" in a series of articles for the Los Angeles Times. The newspaper received the 2005 Pulitzer Prize for Public Service "for its courageous, exhaustively researched series exposing deadly medical problems and racial injustice at a major public hospital". The series was also recognized by other journalism awards.

Another series by Ornstein and Weber, "When Caregivers Harm: California's Unwatched Nurses" in 2009, was a finalist for the Public Service Pulitzer. The citation recognized LA Times and ProPublica for "their exposure of gaps in California’s oversight of dangerous and incompetent nurses, blending investigative scrutiny and multimedia storytelling to produce corrective changes."

Previously based in Burbank, California, he lives in Glen Ridge, New Jersey with his wife and three sons. Miles, Jude, and Holden.

Awards
 2005 Pulitzer Prize for Public Service (awarded to the Los Angeles Times)
 2006 Robert F. Kennedy Journalism Award
 2010 Pulitzer Prize for Public Service finalist
 2014 Health Policy Hero Award from National Center for Health Research

References

External links
Ornstein at Twitter

C-SPAN Q&A interview with Ornstein and Tracy Weber about "The Troubles at King/Drew", July 17, 2005

American male journalists
The Daily Pennsylvanian people
University of Pennsylvania alumni
Living people
Los Angeles Times people
Year of birth missing (living people)
Place of birth missing (living people)